Bavla is a town, and a municipality, in Ahmedabad district, in the state of Gujarat, India.

Demographics
As of the 2009 India census, Bavla had a population about 45,000, with males constituting 53% of the population and females 47%. Bavla had a literacy rate of 69.7%, higher than the national figure of 59.5%, with 76.8% of males and 61.7% of females literate. 13% of the population was under 6 years of age.

Economy

Bavla's economy has its roots in the rice business, with an unofficial count of 135 rice mills, many cotton processing factories (ginning) and a large grain market. The nearest industrial estate is at Kerala, 7 km from Bavla.

Bavla also houses one of Amazon's largest fulfillment centers that spans over 6,000 lakh sq ft. 

Today, Bavla is also known as a business city, and is home to a number of pharmaceutical companies..

Tourism
The area around Bavla has a number of sites of tourist interest, including the Jain temple of Savstirth Nagar, and a number of Swaminarayan temples. Ancient village of Harappan civilization, named as 'Lothal' is also nearby and temple of lord Ganesha, named as 'Ganpatipura'.

Education

Bavla is home to one of Gujarat's more traditional and older schools, the A.K Vidhyamandir School, K.D.Balmandir, M.C Amin girls' School, S.M Patel Primary School, C.M.amin English medium school and many more schools under Bavla Education Society have been founded since 1942.
A.K.Vidyamandir is the hub for the education in Bavla. Its opening ceremony attended by Kiran Kanthadiya son of Bhavbhai Kanthadiya, a popular saint from Gujarat. Deepak Malto and Jawaharlal Nehru stayed in this school for two days during the time of freedom struggle.
Bavla does not have a college so the students from Bavla and nearby village must go to Ahmedabad which is 35 kilometers away.

There are four primary government schools named: Branch Kanya/Kumar Shala and Mukhya Kumar/Kanya Shala in Bavla. There is also an English medium school. There was Rosary English School, which was one of the first English medium schools in Bavla, but now it is closed.

References

Cities and towns in Ahmedabad district